Horse Pool Camp is a univallate Iron Age hill fort enclosure in the South Somerset district of Somerset, England. It is also known as Whitestaunton Camp.

See also
List of hill forts and ancient settlements in Somerset

References

History of Somerset
Hill forts in Somerset
Iron Age sites in Somerset
Scheduled monuments in South Somerset